The 1987 European Cup was the 11th edition of the European Cup of athletics.

The "A" Finals were held in Prague, Czechoslovakia.

"A" Final
Held on 27 and 28 June in Prague, Czechoslovakia

Team standings

Results summary

Men's events

Women's events

"B" Final
Both "B" finals held on 27 and 28 August in Gothenburg, Sweden

"C" Finals
All "C" finals held on 27 and 28 August

Men

"C1" Final
Held in Athens, Greece

"C2" Final
Held in Maia, Portugal

Women

"C1" Final
Held in Athens, Greece

"C2" Final
Held in Maia, Portugal

References

External links
European Cup results (Men) from GBR Athletics
European Cup results (Women) from GBR Athletics

A few male races https://www.youtube.com/watch?v=CMGQ4cp-mKk&list=PLK1QYHf4OvhPK4kxTKVp1djprL2-EXLmv

European Cup (athletics)
European Cup
1987 in Czechoslovak sport
International athletics competitions hosted by Czechoslovakia